Nithari Village is a village in Noida the western part of the state of Uttar Pradesh, India, bordering on New Delhi. A large number of residents in the village are economic migrants from states such as Bihar and West Bengal. 
Nithari forms part of the New Okhla Industrial Development Authority's planned industrial city, Noida, falling in Sector 31.

Nithari village is most notably associated with the serial murders of young children that were reported in December 2006.

References 

Villages in Gautam Buddh Nagar district